Soxna Aïcha Mama Kane is a Senegalese nurse and politician and was a member of the National Assembly elected in March 2007.

Biography
Coming from a Mauritanian Halpulaar Tidiane family, Aissa Mama Kane attended the John Fitzgerald Kennedy high school, followed by the State Nursing School where she graduated in 1964. 

On February 28, 1980, she married Béthio Thioune, who she met in 1974 in Kaolack where she was a nurse in a municipal dispensary and civil administrator before becoming the spiritual leader of thiantacounes.

Since her husband can not run, she was a candidate on the 2007 Sopi coalition list supporting Abdoulaye Wade in the Senegalese legislative elections of 2007. She was elected as a member of the National Assembly for 5 years. She then give up her profession, practiced in a municipal clinic in Dakar and at the clinic in Medina.

References

Senegalese nurses
Senegalese politicians
Senegalese women in politics
Year of birth missing (living people)
Living people
Place of birth missing (living people)